Jake Peetz (born April 5, 1984) is an American football coach who is an offensive assistant for the Los Angeles Rams of the National Football League (NFL). He previously served as an assistant coach for the Carolina Panthers, Alabama, Oakland Raiders, Washington Redskins and Jacksonville Jaguars. He was previously an offensive coordinator for the LSU Tigers.

Coaching career

Early career
Before his first major coaching job, Peetz spent time with UCLA, the Jacksonville Jaguars, Alabama, & the Washington Redskins. He would rejoin his former head coach in Jacksonville, Jack Del Rio, with the Oakland Raiders in 2017.

Oakland Raiders
After spending two years as an assistant, Peetz was named the quarterbacks coach of the Oakland Raiders. The Raiders went 6-10 and head coach Jack Del Rio was fired at the end of the season. Under his coaching, Derek Carr was named to the Pro Bowl.

Carolina Panthers
After spending a year at Alabama, Peetz was named the running backs coach of the Carolina Panthers in 2019 after former coach Jim Skipper retired. Under his coaching, Christian McCaffrey led the NFL in touches, total touchdowns and all-purpose yards. He also led all running backs in points scored and receptions, and was named 1st-team All-Pro and selected to the Pro Bowl. In 2020, Peetz was named the team's quarterbacks coach under new head coach Matt Rhule.

LSU
On January 6, 2021, Peetz was hired to be the offensive coordinator at Louisiana State University (LSU) under head coach Ed Orgeron. In 2021, Max Johnson threw for 27 touchdowns which ranks for 4th in LSU history.

Rams
In 2022 he was hired to the Rams under Sean McVay.

References

1984 births
Living people
Jacksonville Jaguars coaches
Washington Redskins coaches
Oakland Raiders coaches
People from O'Neill, Nebraska
Carolina Panthers coaches
UCLA Bruins football coaches
Alabama Crimson Tide football coaches
LSU Tigers football coaches
Jacksonville Jaguars scouts
Los Angeles Rams coaches